Trąbczyn D is a settlement in the administrative district of Gmina Zagórów, within Słupca County, Greater Poland Voivodeship, in west-central Poland.

The settlement has a population of 15.

References

Villages in Słupca County